Michael Burns (1961 – 5 May 2015) was an Irish Gaelic footballer who played as a midfielder for the Cork senior team.

Born in Castlehaven, County Cork, Burns first arrived on the inter-county scene at the age of seventeen when he first linked up with the Cork minor team before later joining the under-21 side. He made his senior debut during the 1981-82 league. Burns later became a regular member of the team and won one All-Ireland medal, two Munster medals and one National Football League medal as a non-playing substitute.

At club level Burns was a one-time Munster medallist with Castlehaven. In addition to this he has also won one championship medal.

Throughout his career Burns made 8 championship appearances. He retired from inter-county football following the conclusion of the 1990 championship.

Honours

Player

Castlehaven
Munster Senior Club Football Championship (3): 1989, 1994 (sub), 1997 (sub)
Cork Senior Football Championship (3): 1989, 1994 (sub), 1997 (sub)

Cork
All-Ireland Senior Football Championship (1): 1989 (sub)
Munster Senior Football Championship (3): 1988 (sub), 1989 (sub)
National Football League (1): 1989-90
All-Ireland Under-21 Football Championship (2): 1980, 1981
Munster Under-21 Football Championship (3): 1980 (sub), 1981, 1982 (c)

References

1961 births
2015 deaths
Castlehaven Gaelic footballers
Cork inter-county Gaelic footballers